Luis Rodríguez Moya, better known as Luis Moya (born 23 September 1960) is a now-retired Spanish rally co-driver, synonymous with driver Carlos Sainz. He is the third most successful co-driver in the history of the World Rally Championship (WRC), after Daniel Elena and  Timo Rautiainen. He was born in A Coruña.

Biography
Only ever navigating at WRC level for his compatriot, 1990 and 1992 Drivers' Champion Carlos Sainz, he scored 24 world rally victories throughout his career for marques such as Subaru, Toyota and Ford, which lasted until he left the latter team at the end of the 2002 season. He was replaced at Sainz's new team, Citroën after retiring at the end of the 2002 season, for the full 2003 and 2004 seasons (as well as two rallies in the 2005 season) by another Spaniard, Marc Martí, former co-driver of 2001 Tour de Corse winner, Jesús Puras (and who went on to co-drive the 2005 Junior World Rally Champion and subsequent works driver for Citroën, Sainz protégé Daniel Sordo).

Moya's long-standing record of individual wins has since been surpassed by Sébastien Loeb's co-driver Daniel Elena and Marcus Grönholm's co-driver Timo Rautiainen.

Moya also served as Subaru World Rally Team's Sporting Director from 2003 to 2006.

Later Moya joined Volkswagen's rally team and worked as an ambassador for VW when the team competed in WRC.

References

External links
Luis Moya's official Twitter
Luis Moya's Complete WRC entries list
Luis Moya EWRC stats page

Spanish rally co-drivers
1960 births
World Rally Championship people
Living people
World Rally Championship co-drivers